Dragon Flyz is an animated television series created by Savin Yeatman-Eiffel and produced by Gaumont Multimédia in association with Abrams/Gentile Entertainment. The show, based on a toy line by Galoob, ran for two seasons, in syndication in the US and Europe. 26 episodes were produced.

The program centers on a coalition known as the Dragonators (a combination of "dragon" and "aviators"), a set of humans who ride on dragon-back in search-and-rescue operations. 

David Perlmutter's Encyclopedia of American Animated Television Shows calls Dragon Flyz "a very transparent ad for a toy line, much like some of the other productions the Abrams/Gentile Studio was involved in at this time (see Happy Ness: The Secret of the Loch and Van-Pires for other examples."

Storyline
Set in the 41st century, after an event called "The Cataclysm", the series depicts the adventures of dragon-riders either human or of a reptilian, gargoyle and demon-like race, at war for control of the Earth. The battle occurs above a largely inhospitable landscape, either volcanic or barren; rivers of lava flow freely over the surface, inhabited by animals adapted to the unusual environment. The remaining human population dwells in an air-borne city known as "Airlandis", from which dragonators regularly travel to the surface to retrieve the fuel of its operation: the oviform purple crystals known as "Amber" (usually obtained from lava pools, or directly from the ground).

The nature of "The Cataclysm" is never mentioned, though in the opening sequence the surface is depicted as a post-apocalyptic scene, implying nuclear warfare. Earth's inhabitants, ecosystems, and species have been exterminated, save those sheltered in an "Oasis".  The skies immediately above the surface are ravaged by continuous lightning storms, dangerous air currents, and acidic clouds, known as the "Warp Winds", through which the only safe passages are the hollow mountains known as "Wind Pits".

Any pockets of life, where any of the planet's former species dwell in relative safety, are known as "Oasis". One such "Oasis" is discovered by protagonists Z'neth and Apex, whereupon Z'neth challenges Dreadwing to a duel for its ownership. Impatient, Dreadwing causes his dragon mount, Blackheart, to set the Oasis ablaze.  At the end of the episode, Apex is seen carrying a birds' nest, with a few eggs, on the saddle of her Dragon.

Airlandis is an airborne city (see Laputa) golden in color. Five large "bio-spheres" hover in its centre, each simulating a different natural habitat and thus preserving the species rescued from the Cataclysm. The city's most important region is its "power core", operated by the engineer Orac, who requires a regular supply of Amber. Additionally Airlandis has a runway for the Dragonators, a Dragon aviary (where the Dragons reside when not needed to fly), a Council Chamber (where matters of government are negotiated), a Control Room (known as "Skywatch", where a team of uniformed men maintain the city's systems and monitor the skies), and a prison. Dialogue implies that the populace seek a residence on the surface untouched by the Cataclysm. It is shown in one episode that some humans escaped the Cataclysm aboard a space station, on which the protagonists' mother now resides.

Characters
All the main characters, good or evil, ride dragon mounts into battle, but have the ability to fly short distances themselves.  The Dragonators make use of a technology whereby dragonfly-like wings (known as "Exo-wings") emerge from the back-plate of their armor; whereas Dreadwing and his minions the Dramen literally 'sprout' membraneous wings from their shoulders. Both types of wing vanish after the immediate flight's conclusion. The Dragonators' chief weapon is the "Wind Jammer": a wrist-mounted weapon that fires blue energy bolts; whereas Dreadwing and his minions wield glove-like cannons which launch balls or streams of lava.  All four protagonists' names are associated with height or elevation.

Humans

Z'neth
Callsign: Dragonator One
Hair Colour: White
Armor Color: Cerulean
Dragon Steed: Riptor

The leader of the Dragonators, and the eldest of the four siblings, Z'neth (pronounced "zenith", meaning "directly above") is characterised by honour and integrity.

Summit
Callsign: Dragonator Two
Hair Colour: Bleached Blonde
Armor Color: Forest Green
Dragon Steed: Sky-Fury, called "Fury" for short

The second-eldest sibling amongst the four. Summit is known for his various witty remarks, quick anger, and preference for physical strength in trouble. His name means "the highest point of a mountain".

Apex
Callsign: Dragonator Three
Hair Colour: Orange
Armor Color: Silver
Dragon Steed: Blazewind, called "Blaze" for short

Apex is the third-oldest sibling, and the only female. She prefers negotiation to conflict, and is primarily known for her telepathic abilities by which she can communicate with dragons, and even partially manipulate half-dragons, such as Dramen, into doing her bidding. When using her powers, her eyes, and those of her subject, glow a silvery colour. Her name means "the uppermost tip of a triangle".

Peak
Callsign: Dragonator Four
Hair Colour: Blond
Armor Color: Orange/Purple
Dragon Steed: Wingstorm, called "Storm" for short

Peak is the youngest, and the most reckless, of the siblings.  He enjoys stunt-flying on dragon-back, which lands him in trouble, and is quite egoistical and mischievous. His name indicates "the top", as of a mountain or hill.

Amod
Callsign: Dragonator Five
Hair Colour: Blonde
Armor Color: Brown
Dragon Steed: Titan

Amod is another member of the Dragon Flyz, and a close friend of Peak's. He is skilled in battle, but initially disrespectful to dragons until convinced to behave otherwise.

Zarkan
Callsign: Dragonator Six
Hair Colour: Brown
Armor Color: Black
Dragon Steed: Thunder

Zarkan is a soldier of the Dragon Flyz, and loyal to the leading characters.

Nora
Callsign: Dragonator Nine
Hair Colour: Orange
Armor Color: Light Blue
Dragon Steed: Unnamed

Nora is the second female Dragonator in Airlandis, and the object of Peak's romantic interest. She fights alongside the other Dragonators with her own Dragon.

Aaron
Hair Colour: White
Armor Colour: Red

Aaron is the father of the four protagonists, and frequently acts as their advisor. He cannot use his legs and therefore is unable to walk, and instead hovers above the floor. This levitation is implied to be controlled by his staff, which carries an Amber crystal. He is the strongest advocate, on Airlandis' ruling council, for the search for a terrestrial refuge.

Orac
Orac is an engineer who maintains Airlandis' power generator. Grumpy in disposition, he is always seen wearing his uniform and gloves.

Councillor Joshua
A ranking member of Airlandis' governing parliament, wherein he often takes opposition to Aaron's position. Although his intentions are for the good of the populace, his impatience ultimately leads him to place Summit in prison, permitting Dreadwing control of the city. He is sometimes considered analogous to the Biblical Joshua.

Mutants

Dreadwing
Skin Colour: Red
Dragon Steed: Blackheart

Dreadwing is the chief antagonist of the story, established in a mechanized cave complex known as "Warnado" (possibly a portmanteau of the English "war" and "tornado"). He appears akin to the Biblical Satan in his villainous character, gargoyle-like appearance, and inhospitable living environment. Supporting this, he is once called a 'Fallen Angel', and once misquotes Dante Alighieri's introduction to Hell: 'Abandon all hope, ye who enter here'.

Nocturna
Skin Colour: Cyan
Dragon Steed: Unnamed

Nocturna is Dreadwing's second-in-command; her defining trait is service to Dreadwing in return for a domain of her own. When Dreadwing offers her the Oasis, in exchange for her continued loyalty, she accepts and is angered when Dreadwing destroys it.  Her Dragon is unnamed, but resembles her in colour, and bears a crest similar to that on Nocturna's head. Seems to have a bit of a crush on Z'neth, to the point where she will let them go or even side with them on rare occasion.

Fryte
Skin Colour: brown
Dragon Steed: Skunk

Fryte is a hunchbacked servant of Dreadwing, and unquestioningly loyal to his master. As with Nocturna, his Dragon mount bears resemblance to its rider.

Gangryn
A mutant scientist who serves Dreadwing. He is ambitious, but aged and bent, and will quickly change allegiances for his own sake.

The Gremwings
Gremwings (a portmanteau of "gremlin" and "wings") are bipedal, insect-like creatures known for their definitive screeching and disproportionately large mouths, and are distinguished by an impressive physical strength. They serve Dreadwing in vast hordes. Variations of this character include a monocular, batlike species which serves Dreadwing as a collector of information, and a similar species which feed on blood.

The Dramen
Skin Colour: Purple/Grey
Dragon Steed: Unnamed

The Dramen (portmanteau of "dragon" and "men") are large, gargoyle-like humanoids that 'sprout' wings from their bodies on demand.  Dreadwing's Dramen are sometimes seen supporting Dreadwing and his lieutenants on dragon-back.

Dram
Callsign: None
Skin Colour: Orange/Brown
Armor Color: Dark Brown
Dragon Steed: Titan

Dram is a Dramen raised by Aaron when his village was mysteriously destroyed, whose loyalty to them has caused other Dramen to name him a 'traitor', much to his resentment.  His dragon Titan has made only a few appearances; Dram prefers to fly on his own wings, though he never seems to have trouble keeping up with his comrades.  Dram's name is a shortened version of 'Dramen', though he shares it with an archaic unit of measurement.

Vydak
Vydak makes two appearances throughout the series. He is the tribal leader of a clan of brown-skinned Dark Dramen who destroyed Dram's village and killed his family, and later enslaved another clan. When he is first seen, Dreadwing is attempting an alliance, but fails when Dram attempts to rescue the enslaved villagers. In his second appearance, his warriors are seen meeting with Dreadwing's army in a canyon before their attack on Airlandis, each leader plotting to betray the other.

Dragons
There are three varieties of dragons shown in the series. The first and most common are the Airlandian/Wild dragons. They have smooth-skinned, slightly serpentine bodies; long, slender necks and tails; needle-like teeth; and pterosaur-like wings on which they can walk (often in the absence of forelegs) individuals are distinguishable by colouration and head shape. The second type is a large-bodied, stocky, four-legged breed with very short necks, ridden by Fryte, Kreigo and Nocturna. The third breed, represented solely by Blackheart, has features of both previous breeds, is unusually large, and has the ability to consume lava and consequently breathe fire. All dragons are extremely intelligent and seem to understand everything said to them. They are always loyal to their riders, even when the affairs thereof do not apparently concern them. Airlandian dragons live, when not on duty, in a vast, hangarlike station consisting of nesting areas and a somewhat terraformed environment including a lake. On duty, they are exceedingly disciplined, so that under no circumstances do they abandon their riders.

Riptor
Rider: Z'Neth

Riptor is the most powerful Arlandian dragon and is considered the dragons' leader, as evidenced by his larger nesting area, collar and crest armor. He is blue, with a nasal horn and two large crests. Riptor has a personal rivalry with Blackheart and is one of only two dragons (and the only Airlandian dragon) able to contend with him.

Sky Fury
Rider: Summit

A green female with two brown horns. Sky Fury, called "Fury" for short, is the only female mount among the protagonists' steeds and has no hesitation in taking action uncommanded.

Fury's Cub
Rider: Unknown

A small, green dragon born early in the series. His sire is unidentified. While still an egg, he was captured by Nocturna, sent by Dreadwing to capture dragons' eggs for a genetic experiment performed by Gangryn, with the effect that when he hatched, he was able to project a paralyzing blast. Dreadwing attempted to use this ability as a weapon, but failed when Sky Fury persuaded the hatchling to join her. A strong familial loyalty formed thereafter between Fury and her son.

Wing Storm
Rider: Peak

A young, steel-grey dragon, having a spiky head and a long mouth fringed by what may be either points of flesh or protuberant fangs. Both Wing Storm and Peak are reckless, though "Storm" is the more cautious of the two.

Blazewind
Rider: Apex

A white, black-maned dragon. Blazewind is closer to his rider than most by virtue of Apex's ability to communicate telepathically.

Blackheart
Rider: Dreadwing

A massive four-legged, long-necked, red-scaled dragon with the ability to consume lava, which he expels as fire or a gaseous incandescence. The only dragon usually his equal is Riptor; but he is once beaten by the leader of a pack of Wild Dragons (who was slightly larger and like Blackheart, able to breathe fire).

Episode guide
The first three episodes were released as a stand-alone movie titled Dragon Flyz: The Legend Begins on December 3, 1996.

Toy line
There are two sets of Dragon Flyz toys released by Galoob. One set consists of the central characters in various costumes, equipped with rotating wings that enable them to fly, a launching device shaped as a dragon, and a DVD. The second set does not have the DVD, and the launcher does not look like a dragon. Variations include lone riders; lone dragons that fly by flapping their own wings; and figures that illuminate when launched. Most of the rider figures carry firearm-like weapons. Galoob released a similar toy design aimed at girls, called Sky Dancers.

Home video
Dragon Flyz had five VHS releases released by Columbia TriStar Home Video, four numbered volumes with a single episode each and "Dragon Flyz: The Legend Begins", a compilation of the first three episodes. There have been two region 2 DVDs, each with three episodes, in addition to those sold alongside the toys.  The entire series has been officially released for viewing on YouTube by Mondo World.

References

External links

1996 American television series debuts
1997 American television series endings
1996 French television series debuts
1997 French television series debuts
1990s French animated television series
Fiction set in the 5th millennium
American children's animated science fantasy television series
French children's animated science fantasy television series
1990s American animated television series
Post-apocalyptic animated television series
Action figures
Xilam
Television series by Sony Pictures Television
Television series set in the future
Animated television series about dragons
American children's animated action television series
American children's animated adventure television series
American children's animated drama television series
French children's animated action television series
French children's animated adventure television series
French children's animated drama television series
France Télévisions children's television series
Television series about mutants